The following outline is provided as an overview of and topical guide to the wars of the Three Kingdoms:

Wars of the Three Kingdoms – A series of interconnected conflicts within the kingdoms of England, Ireland and Scotland which took place from 1639-1651.

Background 

Incidents which can be seen as leading to the wars of the Three Kingdoms:
 Personal Rule - The period of 1629-1640 where King Charles I ruled without recourse to Parliament.
 Jenny Geddes starts riot in Edinburgh - Incident in 1637 starting protests over the use of the Book of Common Prayer by the Church of Scotland.
 Signing of the National Covenant - 1638 declaration to defend the Church of Scotland from the reforms of King Charles I

Participants 
The wars of the Three Kingdoms was fought between combatants of the following forces:
 Royalists - Forces in all three kingdoms loyal to Charles I of England and his son Charles II of England.
 Covenanters - Scottish Presbyterians organised by the Church of Scotland.
 Confederate Ireland - For a period from 1642-1649 this faction achieved self rule, and was allied to the Royalists.
 Parliamentarians - Fought with the goal of giving Parliament supreme executive power.

Governing bodies 
The following bodies were all involved in governing one of the participating groups.
 Long Parliament - Parliament of England sitting from 1640-1660
 Committee of Estates - Governed Scotland
 Oxford Parliament (1644) - Formed by Charles I as part the Royalist war effort.

Main conflicts 
The wars of the Three Kingdoms included the following conflicts:
 Bishops' Wars - Conflicts in 1639 and 1640 over the governance of the Church of Scotland.
 Irish Confederate Wars - Conflict in Ireland from 1641-1653.
 Irish Rebellion of 1641 - Rebellion by Irish Catholics.
 Cromwellian conquest of Ireland - Conquest of Ireland led by Oliver Cromwell from 1649-1653.
 English Civil Wars - Series of conflicts over the rule of England which included combatants from Scotland and Ireland as well.
 First English Civil War - 1642-1646.
 Second English Civil War - 1648.
 Third English Civil War - 1649-1651.

Notable events 

The following non-military events were connected to the wars of the Three Kingdoms.
 Short Parliament - Sat for three weeks in 1640, before being dissolved by Charles.
 Treaty of Ripon - 1640 agreement ceding Northumberland and County Durham to Scottish Covenanter forces, forcing King Charles I to recall Parliament.
 Grand Remonstrance - List of grievances presented by Parliament to King Charles I in 1641.
 Solemn League and Covenant - 1643 agreement between Scottish Covenanters and English Parliamentarians.
 Execution of Charles I - Occurred in 1649.

Notable individuals

Political leaders 

 King Charles I - Ruler of the Three Kingdoms from 1625-1649.
 King Charles II - King of Scotland from 1649-1651 and then ruler of all three kingdoms from 1660.
 John Pym - Leader of Parliamentary opposition to the King.
 Archibald Campbell, 1st Marquess of Argyll - De facto head of the Scottish government throughout most of the period.

Military leaders 
 Oliver Cromwell - General in the Parliamentarian army.
 Thomas Fairfax - Commander-in-Chief of the Parliamentarian army.
 Alexander Leslie, 1st Earl of Leven - Covenanter commander.
 James Graham, 1st Marquess of Montrose - Fought initially for the Scottish Covenanters, before later fighting for King Charles I as the English Civil War developed.
 Prince Rupert of the Rhine - Royalist commander.

Others 
 Jenny Geddes - Incited riot thought to have led to the Bishops' Wars

Events outside the Three Kingdoms 
Prior to and during the wars of the Three Kingdoms, the Kingdom of England held dominion over a number of colonies and protectorates. The wars spread to these areas as well.
 Channel Islands in the Wars of the Three Kingdoms
 English overseas possessions in the Wars of the Three Kingdoms

Aftermath 

The wars of the Three Kingdoms resulted in the following situations:
 Commonwealth of England - Created in 1649 following the execution of Charles I of England.
 Interregnum (1649–1660) - Ended when Charles II of England ascended to the throne.

See also 
 European wars of religion
 Thirty Years' War
 Timeline of the Wars of the Three Kingdoms

External links 

 British Civil Wars, Commonwealth and Protectorate Project
 Chronology of The Wars of the Three Kingdoms
 The Wars of the Three Kingdoms Article by Jane Ohlmeyer arguing that the English Civil War was just one of an interlocking set of conflicts that encompassed the British Isles in the mid-17th century

Wikipedia outlines
 
17th century in England
17th century in Ireland
17th century in Scotland
17th-century conflicts
Wars involving England
Wars involving Ireland
Wars involving Scotland